Nigel Tasman Lovell (27 January 1916 – 13 December 2001) was an Australian stage, radio, film and television actor, and producer of opera and both stage and radio drama.

History
Lovell was born in Sydney, a son of  Tasman Lovell, Professor of Psychology and Dean of the Faculty of Arts, Sydney University, living at Honda Road, Neutral Bay.
He was educated at "Shore" (Sydney Church of England Grammar School) and studied law at Sydney University, graduating BA in 1938, and was an active member of the Sydney University Dramatic Society under director May Hollinworth.
While with SUDS he was spotted by the director of drama for the Australian Broadcasting Commission, Frank Clewlow, who gave him small roles in several radio plays.
Handsome, well-connected and gregarious, his name frequently cropped up in Sydney's social pages.
In 1950 he joined the Metropolitan Theatre, again under Hollinworth, and when she fell ill he took over production.
In 1951 he won a Commonwealth Jubilee Arts Scholarship in Drama, a travelling scholarship awarded by the British Council to study production in England.
He continued acting for the ABC under producers Eric John and Frank Zeppel in the last decade of Australian radio drama, and in several ABC-TV historical plays. He was also a regular in Crawford Productions for commercial TV.
In 1972 he joined the staff of ABC Radio as a producer of education programmes.

Selected performances
Stage
With Sydney University Dramatic Society
As You Like It (William Shakespeare) as the servant Adam
Don Juan (James Elroy Flecker's 1925 play) as Lord Frantingham (and the statue) in April 1936
Death Takes a Holiday (Walter Ferris, based on Alberto Cassela's play La Morte in Vacanza and a 1934 film)
The Merchant of Venice (Shakespeare) as Bassanio in June 1938 with Lyndall Barbour as Portia
Hotel Universe (Philip Barry) in September 1938 opposite Marion Johns.
Tuttifäntchen (Paul Hindemith) as the puppet-master; Collegium Musicum Sydney, Christmas, 1938
Professionally
French Without Tears (Terence Rattigan) at the Minerva, May 1940.
(as producer/director)
Raymond, Lord of Milan (a hundred-year-old Australian drama by Edward Reeve) by the Metropolitan Theatre 1950
A Masked Ball (Giuseppe Verdi) for the New South Wales Opera / National Opera Company in 1951, starring June Bronhill
The Flying Dutchman (Richard Wagner) in July 1953, the orchestra conducted by Eugene Goossens.
Il trovatore — Lovell's June 1954 production of the Verdi opera at the Empire Theatre for the National Opera of Australia / National Opera Company received a caustic review from at least one critic.
Faust (Charles Gounod) at the Empire Theatre in July 1954.
Winter Journey (Clifford Odets) at the Independent Theatre in September 1955, starring Diana Perryman and John Meillon
The Big Knife (Clifford Odets) at Independent Theatre in 1957

Radio
Radio adaptation of The Wild Ass's Skin (Honoré de Balzac)Hands Across the Table (the Viña Delmar play behind the 1935 film) for Lux Theatre March 1939Those We Love (the Agnes Ridgeway serial — not the George Abbott play behind the 1932 film), with Peter Finch, John Cazabon, Theresa Desmond and others, April 1939Magnificent Obsession based on the story by Lloyd C. Douglas in April 1939By Wire (mystery play by Mary Penelope Lucy, a Sydney author) May 1939Smilin' Thru from the Jane Cowl and Jane Murfin play Smilin' Through February 1940Four Daughters, adapted from the 1938 film, first of a series for Harry Dearth's "Radio Theatre" by arrangement with Warner Bros. Big Sister serial starring Thelma Scott, Peter Finch, Peter Dunstan and Bettie Dickson  on 2UW in 1946Crossroads of Life serial with a similar cast on 2UW in 1946–1947Danger Unlimited (Max Afford) serial with Lovell and Barbour as Jeffery and Elizabeth Blackburn on 2UE 1946–1948Perfect Strangers (the Clemence Dane play behind the 1945 film) May 1948A Bill of Divorcement (Clemence Dane, and filmed several times), also with Camilla Ley, in April 1949The Cure for Love, (the Walter Greenwood play behind the 1949 film) also with Frances Worthington, in August 1953

 Film
 Eureka Stockade (1949)
 Wherever She Goes (1951; as the father of Eileen Joyce)
 The Shiralee (1957; uncredited)
 The Dispossessed (1959)
 Strange Holiday (1970)
 Ned Kelly (1970)
 Let the Balloon Go (1976)

 Television
Roles in such television series as:
 Stormy Petrel (1960)
 Whiplash (1961)
 Consider Your Verdict (1962)
 Divorce Court (1967)
 Skippy the Bush Kangaroo (1968)
 Hunter (1967–69)
 Matlock Police (1973)
 Homicide (1965–73)
 Seven Little Australians (1973)
 A Country Practice (1982)

Family
Lovell was a brother of Dr Bruce Tasman Lovell (1910 – 19 September 1986) and Guy Tasman Lovell (15 August 1919 – ). Geoff Lovell is a nephew.

Lovell married Sue Dalton in 1941 and had a daughter Catherine Lovell on 1 January 1947.
His wife died of a heart condition later that year.
 
He married again, to Patricia Anna Parr (1929 – 26 January 2013) in 1956, having met through work with Sydney's Metropolitan Theatre. They had two children: Simon Lovell, a helicopter pilot, and Jenny Lovell, an actor known for her role in the television series Prisoner''.

Patricia Lovell had a significant career in radio and film both before and after their divorce.

References 

1916 births
2001 deaths
Australian male stage actors
Australian radio producers
Australian male radio actors
Australian male film actors
Australian male television actors
Australian opera directors